Valère Bruno René Germain (born 17 April 1990) is a French professional footballer who plays as a forward for Ligue 1 club Montpellier.

Early life
Valère Bruno René Germain was born on 17 April 1990 in Marseille, Bouches-du-Rhône. Germain is the son of former footballer Bruno Germain.

Club career

Monaco
In the 2009 off-season, Germain signed his first professional contract agreeing to a three-year deal. He had previously played in the Monaco Championnat de France Amateur (CFA) team that won the reserve team title in the 2008–09 season. Despite signing professional terms, the striker spent the next two seasons playing in the club's reserve team. Germain made his professional debut on 1 May 2011 in a league match against Saint-Étienne appearing as a substitute. He played in the team's final league match of the season against Lyon appearing as a substitute in a 2–0 defeat. The defeat confirmed Monaco's relegation to Ligue 2.

In the second division, Germain was permanently promoted to the senior team and, on 15 August 2011, he scored his first goal for the club in a 2–1 loss against Reims. In the following month, he scored his second career goal in a 2–2 draw against Sedan. In the 2012–13 campaign, Germain scored 14 goals in 35 matches for AS Monaco as they got promoted to Ligue 1. On 23 July 2013, Germain signed a contract extension with Monaco, keeping him at the club until 2017. Germain was part of the AS Monaco side that won the 2016–2017 Ligue 1 title, contributing with 10 goals.

In July 2015, Germain joined Nice on loan from Monaco. Nice had an option to buy him after the end of the loan spell.

Marseille
On 25 June 2017, Monaco announced that Germain had joined Marseille. He scored his first goal on 28 July in the Europa League third qualifying round against Oostende in his debut match for Marseille (4–2).

On 3 May 2018, he played in the Europa League semi-finals away to Red Bull Salzburg as Marseille played out a 1–2 away win but a 3–2 aggregate lose to lose out to the final.   which Marseille won against Atlético Madrid at the Parc Olympique Lyonnais in Décines-Charpieu, near Lyon in France.

International career
Germain was a France youth international having earned caps at under-21 level. He made his under-21 debut on 2 June 2011 appearing as a substitute in a 1–0 win against Serbia.

Career statistics

Honours
Monaco
 Ligue 1: 2016–17
 Ligue 2: 2012–13

Marseille
 UEFA Europa League runner-up: 2017–18

References

External links

1990 births
Living people
Footballers from Marseille
French footballers
Association football forwards
AS Monaco FC players
OGC Nice players
Olympique de Marseille players
Montpellier HSC players
Ligue 1 players
Ligue 2 players
France youth international footballers
France under-21 international footballers
French expatriate footballers
Expatriate footballers in Monaco
French expatriate sportspeople in Monaco